Nimmagadda Ramesh Kumar was sworn in as 1st Andhra Pradesh State Election Commissioner (after Telangana separation) on 1 April 2016 by Governor Narasimhan. He belongs to 1982 batch of Indian Administrative Service. He served as Special Chief Secretary to Governor before this. He also worked as Executive Officer of Tirumala Tirupati Devasthanams(TTD) and as the Principal Secretary of Finance.

Education 
He earned B.A. (History), LL.B. (Law) degrees and did his post graduate study in Economics.

Career 
He was selected to Indian Administrative Service in 1982. His first job was as a Sub-collector in 1984. He served in different departments in various roles over his long career.  He worked as the Special Chief Secretary to Governor until 31 March 2016 and was appointed as the State Election Commissioner for Andhra Pradesh by Chandra Babu Naidu.  He also worked as the Executive Officer of Tirumala Tirupati Devasthanams(TTD) and as the Principal Secretary of Finance.

Appointment as Andhra Pradesh State Election Commissioner 

After his retirement, he was appointed as Andhra Pradesh State Election Commissioner on 1 April 2016. In 2020 March, after  the first phase of  nominations for MPTC/ZPTC elections were completed, he paused Elections to local bodies  due to Covid 2019 as a measure of public health.  As the state government did not like this step, it took steps to change the duration for the office of SEC to three years from five years and also changed the eligible person as retired high court judge. Thus, he was removed from his post mid term and Justice Kanagaraj was appointed as the new SEC.  Nimmagadda filed a court case against  these actions in High court  and the High court cancelled state government order and restored his position as SEC (subject to Supreme court orders).  Thus he became the third State Election commissioner on July 31, 2020.  During run up to 2021 Andhra Pradesh local elections, Ramesh formed a team, comprising a Secretary to State Election Commission, K. Kanna Babu, IAS as well as a Special Officer N. Sanjay, IPS.

Citations

See this also 
 Andhra Pradesh State Election Commission
 Andhra Pradesh Government

Living people
Indian Administrative Service officers
State Election Commissioners of India
1956 births